Amina is a 1951 Egyptian film directed by Goffredo Alessandrini and starring Assia Noris, Youssef Wahby and Rushdy Abaza.

Cast
 Assia Noris
 Youssef Wahby
 Rushdy Abaza
 Samiha Tawfik
 Seraj Munir

References

Bibliography 
 Moliterno, Gino. Historical Dictionary of Italian Cinema. Scarecrow Press, 2008.

External links 
 

1951 films
Films directed by Goffredo Alessandrini
Egyptian black-and-white films